Phở Kim is a Vietnamese restaurant in Portland, Oregon.

Description and history

Phở Kim is a Vietnamese restaurant specializing in pho, located on 82nd Avenue the southeast Portland part of the Montavilla neighborhood. The restaurant has house-made noodles.

The family-owned restaurant opened in 2013. Owner Kim Lam manages operations and her husband Tony Tien serves as chef. During the COVID-19 pandemic, Phở Kim closed temporarily and implemented seating restrictions to comply with social distancing guidelines. The restaurant caught fire in 2020, forcing a temporary close for repairs and installation of a new roof. A grand reopening ceremony was held in March 2022.

Reception

Samantha Bakall and Michael Russell of The Oregonian gave Phở Kim honorable mention in a 2017 list of "Portland's 5 best bowls of pho", writing: 

They also said of the noodles and ambiance: "Probably the weakest point of the bowl, the noodles weren't bad, just a little clumpy at first, but came apart a bit as the bowl cooled... The redecorated Carrows/Maine Street Restaurant/Saigon Pearl space greets you with several columns of cardboard boxes, but is otherwise pleasant." In Eater Portland 2020 overview of "Where to Find Steamy Bowls of Pho in Portland", Krista Garcia wrote:

See also 

 List of Vietnamese restaurants

References

External links 

 
 Pho Kim at Zomato

2013 establishments in Oregon
Montavilla, Portland, Oregon
Restaurants established in 2013
Southeast Portland, Oregon
Vietnamese restaurants in Portland, Oregon